is a former Japanese football player and manager.

Playing career
Kato was born in Miyagi Prefecture on October 7, 1969. After graduating from Tokai University, he joined Japan Football League club Hitachi (later Kashiwa Reysol) in 1992. He became a regular player as an offensive midfielder in 1994. He also played as forward, not only midfielder. The club also won second place in 1994 and was promoted to the J1 League in 1995. The club won the 1999 J.League Cup. Although he played as a regular player for a long time, he did not play as much in 2002. In 2005, he moved to the J2 League club Shonan Bellmare. He played as a regular player for four seasons and retired at the end of the 2008 season at the age of 39.

Coaching career
After retirement, Kato started a coaching career at Shonan Bellmare in 2009. He served as coach for the top team (2009–10) and manager for the youth team (2011–12). In 2013, he became a manager for Sanno Institute of Management and managed until 2017. In 2018, he moved to Kashiwa Reysol, where he first played. He became a coach under the manager Takahiro Shimotaira who Kato's teammate when Kato played for Reysol. Shimotaira was terminated for poor results in May and Kato became a new manager. However, Kato could not improve the club's record and he was terminated in November.

Club statistics

Managerial statistics

References

External links
 
 

1969 births
Living people
Tokai University alumni
Association football people from Miyagi Prefecture
Japanese footballers
J1 League players
J2 League players
Japan Football League (1992–1998) players
Kashiwa Reysol players
Shonan Bellmare players
Japanese football managers
J1 League managers
Kashiwa Reysol managers
Association football midfielders